Book is a surname. Notable people with the surname include:

Anna Book (born 1970), Swedish singer
Asher Book (born 1988), American dancer, singer-songwriter and actor
Dan Book (born 1983), American songwriter and record producer
Ed Book (born 1970), New Zealand basketball player
Ian Book (born 1998), American football player
Kim Book (born 1946), English footballer and manager
Lauren Book (born 1984), American politician
Nils-Ole Book (born 1986), German footballer
Raymond Book (1925-2018), American politician
Steve Book (born 1969), English footballer
Todd Book (born 1968), American politician
Tony Book (born 1934), English footballer and manager